Netra Bikram Shah is a Nepalese politician, who is a member of the Provincial Assembly of Madhesh Province, from People's Socialist Party, Nepal. Shah is a resident of Rajbiraj, Saptari.

References

External links

Living people
Madhesi people
Members of the Provincial Assembly of Madhesh Province
People from Rajbiraj
People's Socialist Party, Nepal politicians
1979 births